Pleasant Valley is an unincorporated community in Wrenshall Township, Carlton County, Minnesota, United States.

The community is located between Wrenshall and Holyoke at the junction of Carlton County Roads 1 and 112; near State Highway 23 (MN 23).

Pleasant Valley is five miles south of Wrenshall.

Further reading
 Mn/DOT map of Carlton County – 2012 edition

Unincorporated communities in Carlton County, Minnesota
Unincorporated communities in Minnesota